A Beppyo Shrine  is a category of Shinto shrine, as defined by the Association of Shinto Shrines. They are considered to be remarkable in some way, and thus given a higher status than other shrines.

Overview 
With the abolition of the state administration of shrines on February 2, 1946, the official system of shrine rankings (modern shrine rankings system) was abolished, and another system was established in 1948 to replace it. After the abolition of the shrine rating system, all shrines were considered to be on an equal footing (except for Ise Shrine). However, since it would be inconvenient to treat the former official national shrines and some of the larger shrines in the same way as ordinary shrines with regard to the advancement and retirement of Shinto priests, the "Regulations Concerning the Advancement and Retirement of Officials and Employees" stipulate that special treatment be given to them. Since these shrines are listed in the Beppyo of the regulations, they are called "Beppyo Shrines".

The Beppyo Shrine will be given special treatment in terms of personnel, as follows:
 If a certain level of standards are met, a gonin priest is allowed to be appointed under a priest.
 Guji and Guji are not appointed unless they have a rank above the Ming floor (at a general shrine, they are above the Gonjo floor).
 Only those who have a rank above the front floor can be appointed (at a general shrine, the floor is above the direct floor).
 Gonjoi is appointed only to those who have a rank above the right floor (at a general shrine, it is above the direct floor).
 The status of the priest / Guji priest during his tenure is special grade, and those other than the first and second grades are second grade.
 Appointment and dismissal of priests and priests is not a matter of mandate of the director of the shrine of each prefecture (direct appointment and dismissal of the governing of the Association of Shinto Shrines)

In 1951, the Association of Shinto Shrines issued a notice titled "Selection of Shrines for Beppyo," which outlined the criteria for selecting shrines other than those listed in the government's Beppyo Shrine list. The criteria were as follows:
 History
 Status of facilities related to the shrine, such as shrine buildings and precincts
 Number of full-time priests
 Economic situation in the last three years
 Activities of the shrine
 Number and distribution of Ujiko worshippers

As a result of this provision, the number of Beppyo Shrines, mainly former prefectural shrines and Protectorate Shrines designated by the Minister of Home Affairs, has gradually increased to 353 as of 2006.

Beppyo Shrine is not a rating of shrines, like the rating of a company, but a distinction that concerns only the personnel of the Shinto priests. However, the shrines listed in Beppyo are relatively large in terms of the number of shrines, precincts, and priests, and are generally regarded as a kind of rating.  In addition, Ise Jingu is not included in the Beppyo Shrine as a separate shrine, and the Grand Priest of Jingu is appointed and dismissed by the Imperial Court according to the "Jingu Rules", which gives it special treatment.

List of Beppyo Shrines

Shrines that are not Beppyo Shrines 
The following companies are not Beppyo Shrines because they do not have a comprehensive relationship with the Shrine Main Office. Those whose "Year of termination of umbrella relationship" is 1946 are those that have not been in umbrella relationship with the Shrine Headquarters since its establishment in 1946.

References

References

Annotations 

Shinto shrines
Association of Shinto Shrines